The badminton competition at the 1990 Commonwealth Games took place in Auckland, New Zealand from 24 January until 3 February 1990.
Steve Baddeley was forced to withdraw from the men's singles and mixed doubles bronze play off's due to severe blistering on his feet.

Final results

Results

Men's singles

Women's singles

Men's doubles

Women's doubles

Mixed doubles

Mixed team

Semi finals

Bronze medal play off

Final

References

1990
1990 Commonwealth Games events
1990 in badminton
Badminton tournaments in New Zealand